Sa Pa or Sapa, was a frontier township and capital of former Sa Pa District, now a ward of Sa Pa town in Lào Cai Province in north-west Vietnam.

Sa Pa ward is bordered by Mường Hoa commune to the east, Phan Si Păng ward to the west, Cầu Mây ward to the south and the wards of Hàm Rồng, Sa Pả to the north.

References

Populated places in Lào Cai province